The Kevin Whitaker Chevrolet 140 was a NASCAR K&N Pro Series East race that was held annually at Greenville-Pickens Speedway continuously from 2011 to 2014 and again in 2016

History
The Kevin Whitaker Chevrolet 140 was added as a second Greensville-Pickens race to the K&N Pro Series East schedule in 2011, as the Kevin Whitaker Chevrolet 150 had been in existence since 2007.

Past winners

 2012: Race extended due to overtime.

References

External links
 

ARCA Menards Series East
Former NASCAR races
2011 establishments in Virginia
2016 disestablishments in Virginia